The 1982 Stanford Cardinal football team represented Stanford University in the Pacific-10 Conference in the 1982 NCAA Division I-A football season. Led by third-year head coach Paul Wiggin, the Cardinal had an overall record of 5–6 (3–5 in Pac-10, seventh).

This was the first football season for Stanford's new singular nickname Cardinal; from 1972 to 1981, it was the plural Cardinals.
Both represented the color.

Regular season
With consensus All-American John Elway at quarterback, the 1982 Cardinal were exciting - seven of its eleven games were decided in the fourth quarter - but maddeningly erratic:

 After an impressive opening road win at Purdue, the Cardinal dropped a 35–31 decision at home to unranked San Jose State, coached by Elway's father Jack, who became Stanford's head coach in 1984.
 In week 3 at #12 Ohio State, Stanford won on a last-minute eighty-yard drive, scoring the decisive TD with 34 seconds remaining.
 In week 5 at #11 Arizona State, Stanford scored a go-ahead touchdown in the final minute, only to lose on a Sun Devil TD with eleven seconds left on the clock.
 In week 7 at Washington State, the Cardinal scored the winning touchdown with 22 seconds left.
 In week 8 at home, Stanford scored thirty consecutive points to decisively defeat previously unbeaten #2 Washington 43–31, which put Elway on the cover of Sports Illustrated.
 In week 9, at home against unranked Arizona, it gave up 28 unanswered fourth quarter points to lose by fourteen.

After a hard-fought 38–35 loss at Rose Bowl-bound and 12th-ranked UCLA in week 10, the Cardinal traveled to Berkeley for its eleventh game.

Elway's last football game at Stanford was one of the most famous games of all time, the 1982 Big Game versus rival California. It ended with "The Play," a kickoff return for a touchdown with four backward lateral passes and one forward lateral pass that allowed Cal to win the game as time expired.

After that game, Elway congratulated the Stanford Band trombone player that got run over in the end zone. Although Elway never led Stanford to a bowl game, he had an accomplished college career. In his four seasons (1979–1982), he completed 774 passes for 9,349 yards and 77 touchdowns. Stanford had a  record during his tenure. Elway's 24 touchdown passes in 1982 led the nation, and he left with nearly every Stanford and Pacific-10 career record for passing and total offense.

He won Pac-10 Player of the Year honors for the second time in 1982, and was a consensus All-American. In addition, he finished second in Heisman Trophy balloting.

Schedule

Roster

Coaching staff
 Head coach – Paul Wiggin (Stanford '57)
 Associate Head Coach – Ray Handley (Stanford '66)
 Offensive coordinator – Jim Fassel (USC '70)
 Defensive coordinator – Larry Mac Duff (CSU-Fullerton '71)
 Running Backs – Jim Anderson (Cal Western '70)
 Defensive Backs – Chuck Detwiler (Utah State '68)
 Offensive Line – Dick James (UC Davis '62)
 Receivers and Tight Ends – Dave Ottmar (Stanford '74)
 Defensive Line – Fred von Appen (Linfield '64)
 Asst. Coach-Offensive Line – Pete Mangurian (Louisiana State '77)
 Asst. Coach-Secondary – Mike Nolan (Oregon '80)

Season summary

at Purdue

San Jose State

at Ohio State

John Elway threw for 407 yards and 2 touchdowns, including the game-winner to Emile Harry with 34 seconds remaining.

Oregon State

at Arizona State

USC

at Washington State

Washington

Arizona

at UCLA

at California

NFL Draft

Awards and honors
 John Elway – Sammy Baugh Trophy, Pac-10 Player of the Year, Consensus First-team All-American, 2nd in Heisman Trophy voting

References

Stanford
Stanford Cardinal football seasons
Stanford Cardinal football